Michelle de Vries (born 2 October 1961) is an Australian former backstroke swimmer. She competed in three events at the 1976 Summer Olympics.

References

External links
 

1961 births
Living people
Australian female backstroke swimmers
Olympic swimmers of Australia
Swimmers at the 1976 Summer Olympics
Place of birth missing (living people)